The University of Macerata is a public university located in Macerata, Italy. It is one of the oldest universities in Europe that are still functioning.

Overview
It was founded in 1290 and is one of the oldest in Italy. The various Departments and Offices of the University are in the old centre within its medieval walls. The average age of UNIMC teachers, who are used to discussing both academic and current events with their students, is 40. The University of Macerata has seven Faculties to choose from: Cultural Heritage (in the nearby town of Fermo), Economics, Law, Literature and Philosophy, Media Studies, Education Sciences
and Political Sciences. Some offer courses entirely in English.

Organization
These are the 7 faculties in which the university is divided into:

 Faculty of Communication Sciences
 Faculty of Cultural Heritage
 Faculty of Economics
 Faculty of Education
 Faculty of Law
 Faculty of Letters and Philosophy
 Faculty of Political Sciences

See also 
 Cirsdig
 List of early modern universities in Europe
 List of Italian universities
 Macerata

References

Literature 
 Roberto Sani, Sandro Serangeli Per un’introduzione alla storia dell'Universita' di Macerata // Annali di Storia delle Università italiane - Volume 13 (2009)

External links
University of Macerata Website 
Macerata Student Network 
Scholars and Literati at the University of Macerata (1540–1800), Repertorium Eruditorum Totius Europae – RETE.

 
1290 establishments in Europe
13th-century establishments in Italy
University
Culture in le Marche
Buildings and structures in Macerata